Wintuan (also Wintun, Wintoon, Copeh, Copehan) is a family of languages spoken in the Sacramento Valley of central Northern California.

All Wintuan languages are either extinct or severely endangered.

Classification

Family division

Shipley (1978:89) listed three Wintuan languages in his encyclopedic overview of California Indian languages. More recently, Mithun (1999) split Southern Wintuan into a Patwin language and a Southern Patwin language, resulting in the following classification.

I. Northern Wintuan
 1. Wintu (a.k.a. Wintu proper, Northern Wintu) (†)
 2. Nomlaki (a.k.a. Noamlakee, Central Wintu) (†)

II. Southern Wintuan
 3. Patwin (a.k.a. Patween)
 4. Southern Patwin (†)

Wintu became extinct with the death of the last fluent speaker in 2003 (Golla 2011:143). Nomlaki has at least one partial speaker (as of 2010, Golla 2011:143). One speaker of Patwin (Hill Patwin dialect) remained in 2003 (Golla 2011:145). Southern Patwin, once spoken by the Suisun local tribe just northeast of San Francisco Bay, became extinct in the early 20th century and is thus poorly known (Golla 2011:146; Mithun 1999). Wintu proper is the best documented of the four Wintuan languages.

Pitkin (1984) estimated that the Wintuan languages were about as close to each other as the Romance languages. They may have diverged from a common tongue only 2,000 years ago. A comparative study including a reconstruction of Proto-Wintun phonology, morphology and lexicon was undertaken by Shepherd (2006).

Possible relations to external language families

The Wintuan family is usually considered to be a member of the hypothetical Penutian language phylum (Golla 2011:128-168) and was one of the five branches of the original California kernel of Penutian proposed by Roland B. Dixon and Alfred L. Kroeber (1913a, 1913b). However, recent studies suggest that the Wintuans independently entered California about 1,500 years ago from an earlier location somewhere in Oregon (Golla 2007:75-78). The Wintuan pronominal system closely resembles that of Klamath, while there are  numerous lexical resemblances between Northern Wintuan and Alsea that appear to be loans (Golla 1997; DeLancey and Golla 1997; Liedtke 2007).

References

Bibliography
 DeLancey, Scott & Victor Golla (1997). The Penutian hypothesis: Retrospect and prospect. International Journal of American Linguistics, 63, 171-202.
 Dixon, Roland B. & Alfred L. Kroeber (1903). The native languages of California. American Anthropologist, 5, 1-26.
 Dixon, Roland B. & Alfred L. Kroeber (1913a). New linguistic families in California. American Anthropologist, 15, 647-655.
 Dixon, Roland B. & Alfred L. Kroeber (1913b). Relationship of the Indian languages of California. Science, 37, 225.
 Dixon, Roland B. & Alfred L. Kroeber (1919). Linguistic families of California. University of California Publications in American Archaeology and Ethnology 16:47-118. Berkeley: University of California.
 Golla, Victor (1997). The Alsea-Wintu connection. International Journal of American Linguistics, 63, 157-170. 
 Golla, Victor (2007). Linguistic Prehistory. California Prehistory: Colonization, Culture, and Complexity, pp. 71–82. Terry L. Jones and Kathryn A. Klar, editors. New York: Altamira Press. .
 Golla, Victor (2011). California Indian languages. Berkeley: University of California Press. .
 Grant, Anthony (1997). Coast Oregon Penutian. International Journal of American Linguistics, 63, 144-156.
 Liedtke, Stefan (2007).The Relationship of Wintuan to Plateau Penutian. LINCOM studies in Native American linguistics, 55. Muenchen: Lincom Europa. 
 Mithun, Marianne (1999). The languages of Native North America. Cambridge: Cambridge University Press.  (hbk); .
 Pitkin, Harvey (1984). Wintu grammar. University of California publications in linguistics (Vol. 94). Berkeley: University of California Press. .
 Pitkin, Harvey (1985). Wintu dictionary. University of California publications in linguistics (Vol. 95). Berkeley: University of California Press. .
 Schlichter, Alice (1981). Wintu Dictionary. Report #2 of the Survey of California and Other Indian Languages. Department of Linguistics, University of California at Berkeley.
 Shepherd, Alice (1989). Wintu texts. Berkeley: University of California Press. .
 Shipley, William F. (1978). Native Languages of California. Handbook of North American Indians, Vol. 8 (California), pages 80–90. William C. Sturtevant, and Robert F. Heizer, eds. Washington, DC: Smithsonian Institution.  / 0160045754.
 Shepherd, Alice (2006). Proto-Wintun.  University of California publications in linguistics (Vol. 137). Berkeley: University of California Press.
Whistler, Kenneth W. (1977). Wintun Prehistory: An Interpretation based on Linguistic Reconstruction of Plant and Animal Nomenclature. Proceedings of the Third Annual Meeting of the Berkeley Linguistics Society, February 19–21. pp. 157–174. Berkeley.
 Whistler, Kenneth W. (1980). Proto-Wintun kin classification:  A case study in reconstruction of a complex semantic system. (Doctoral dissertation, University of California, Berkeley).

External links

 Native Tribes, Groups, Language Families and Dialects of California in 1770 (map after Kroeber)
 Morphological Parallels between Klamath and Wintu (Scott DeLancey)
 The Wintu Language Project
 Wintu (Wintun)
 Wintu vocabulary words

 
Language
Penutian languages
Indigenous languages of California
Sacramento Valley
Language families
Endangered indigenous languages of the Americas